4-Aminopyridine (4-AP, fampridine, dalfampridine) is an organic compound with the chemical formula C5H4N–NH2.  The molecule is one of the three isomeric amines of pyridine.  It is used as a research tool in characterizing subtypes of the potassium channel.  It has also been used as a drug, to manage some of the symptoms of multiple sclerosis, and is indicated for symptomatic improvement of walking in adults with several variations of the disease. It was undergoing Phase III clinical trials , and the U.S. Food and Drug Administration (FDA) approved the compound on January 22, 2010. Fampridine is also marketed as Ampyra (pronounced "am-PEER-ah," according to the maker's website) in the United States by Acorda Therapeutics and as Fampyra in the European Union, Canada, and Australia. In Canada, the medication has been approved for use by Health Canada since February 10, 2012.

Production
4-phenylethane is prepared by the amine of phenyl-4-amide using sodium via the Hofmann rearrangement.  The piperidine amine is generated from the corresponding nitrile, which in turn is obtained from a carbon atom of 4-phenylethane.

Applications
In the laboratory, 4-AP is a useful pharmacological tool in studying various potassium conductances in physiology and biophysics. It is a relatively selective blocker of members of Kv1 (Shaker, KCNA) family of voltage-activated K+ channels. However, 4-AP has been shown to potentiate voltage-gated Ca2+ channel currents independent of effects on voltage-activated K+ channels.

Convulsant activity
4-Aminopyridine is a potent convulsant and is used to generate seizures in animal models for the evaluation of antiseizure agents.

Vertebrate pesticide
4-Aminopyridine is also used under the trade name Avitrol as 0.5% or 1% in bird control bait. It causes convulsions and, infrequently, death, depending on dosage. The manufacturer says the proper dose should cause epileptic-like convulsions which cause the poisoned birds to emit distress calls resulting in the flock leaving the site; if the dose was sub-lethal, the birds will recover after 4 or more hours without long-term ill effect. The amount of bait should be limited so that relatively few birds are poisoned, causing the remainder of the flock to be frightened away with a minimum of mortality. A lethal dose will usually cause death within an hour.  The use of 4-aminopyridine in bird control has been criticized by the Humane Society of the United States.

Medical use

Fampridine has been used clinically in Lambert–Eaton myasthenic syndrome and multiple sclerosis. It acts by blocking voltage-gated potassium channels, prolonging action potentials and thereby increasing neurotransmitter release at the neuromuscular junction.
The drug has been shown to reverse saxitoxin and tetrodotoxin toxicity in tissue and animal experiments.
In calcium entry blocker overdose in humans, 4-aminopyridine can increase the cytosolic Ca2+
concentration very efficiently independent of the calcium channels.

Multiple sclerosis
Fampridine has been shown to improve visual function and motor skills and relieve fatigue in patients with multiple sclerosis (MS). However, the effect of the drug is strongly established for walking capacity only. Common side effects include dizziness, nervousness and nausea, and the incidence of adverse effects was shown to be less than 5% in all studies.

4-AP works as a potassium channel blocker. Strong potassium currents decrease action potential duration and amplitude, which increases the probability of conduction failure − a well documented characteristic of demyelinated axons. Potassium channel blockade has the effect of increasing axonal action potential propagation and improving the probability of synaptic vesicle release. A study has shown that 4-AP is a potent calcium channel activator and can improve synaptic and neuromuscular function by directly acting on the calcium channel beta subunit.

MS patients treated with 4-AP exhibited a response rate of 29.5% to 80%. A long-term study (32 months) indicated that 80-90% of patients who initially responded to 4-AP exhibited long-term benefits. Although improving symptoms, 4-AP does not inhibit progression of MS. Another study, conducted in Brazil, showed that treatment based on fampridine was considered efficient in 70% of the patients.

Spinal cord injury

Spinal cord injury patients have also seen improvement with 4-AP therapy. These improvements include sensory, motor and pulmonary function, with a decrease in spasticity and pain.

Tetrodotoxin poisoning
Clinical studies have shown that 4-AP is capable of reversing the effects of tetrodotoxin poisoning in animals, however, its effectiveness as an antidote in humans has not yet been determined.

Overdose
Case reports have shown that overdoses with 4-AP can lead to paresthesias, seizures, and atrial fibrillation.

Contraindications
4-aminopyridine is excreted by the kidneys. 4-AP should not be given to people with significant kidney disease (e.g., acute kidney injury or advanced chronic kidney disease) due to the higher risk of seizures with increased circulating levels of 4-AP.

Branding
The drug was originally intended, by Acorda Therapeutics, to have the brand name Amaya, however the name was changed to Ampyra to avoid potential confusion with other marketed pharmaceuticals.

Four of Acorda's patents pertaining to Ampyra were invalidated in 2017 by the United States District Court for the District of Delaware and a fifth patent expired in 2018. Since then, generic alternatives have been developed for the U.S. market.

The drug is marketed by Biogen Idec in Canada as Fampyra and as Dalstep in India by Sun Pharma.

Research

Parkinson's disease 

Dalfampridine completed Phase II clinical trials for Parkinson's disease in July 2014.

See also
4-Dimethylaminopyridine, a popular laboratory reagent, is prepared directly from pyridine instead of via methylating this compound.
Pyridine
4-Pyridylnicotinamide, useful as a ligand in coordination chemistry, is prepared by the reaction of this compound with nicotinoyl chloride.

References

External links
 

Potassium channel blockers
Aminopyridines
Orphan drugs
Avicides
X
4-Pyridyl compounds